Murree Wildlife Park is a Zoo located in Bansra Gali, in Murree Pakistan. This Park was initially inaugurated under the National Development Scheme 'Development of Wildlife Park' in 1986. The wildlife park provides canteens and cafeterias for the tourists and visitors.

Demographics 
The Murree Wildlife Park covers an area of 240 acres.

Species list 
The wildlife park has the below listed species:

Mammals

 Siberian tiger
 Red deer
 Yak(Bos gruniens)
 Asian black bear
 Bactrian camel
 Chital
 Chinkara
 Sambar

Birds
 Black Shoulder Peafowl (Pavo cristatus)
 Guinea fowl (Numididae)
 Green Pheasant (Phasianus versicolor)

Gallery

References 

Zoos in Pakistan
Parks in Murree
Parks in Pakistan
Wildlife parks in Pakistan